The Fandom is a 2020 documentary film that focuses on the history of the furry fandom. Directed by filmmakers Ash Kreis and Eric Risher, it was released digitally and on Blu-Ray on July 3, 2020. The film is Kreis' directorial debut.

Synopsis 
The Fandom focuses on the furry fandom's early history and evolution as an internet community. The documentary features interviews from figures within the fandom, including Mark Merlino and Rod O'Riley (founders of ConFurence, the first furry convention), Joe Strike (author of Furry Nation, a history of the furry fandom), and Samuel Conway, chairman of the Anthrocon convention. These interviews are interspersed with footage from furry conventions past and present.

Production 
The Fandom was funded through Kickstarter with a budget of $32 thousand. Director Ash Kreis described to Pittsburgh Post-Gazette that despite recent positivity of furry fandom coverage, she wanted to put several misconceptions to rest and show the community in its true form.

The Fandom marks the directorial debut for Kreis, who previously worked in the production team for films like Being Evel.

Release 
The Fandom premiered on Kreis' YouTube channel on July 3, 2020. The Blu-Ray and other digital versions were released the same day.

Reception 
The Fandom was well-received and praised by critics. Cartoon Brew praised its inclusivity and humor. Colorado Springs Independent applauded the film for its appeal and its thorough detail. The film won an Ursa Major Award in the Non-Fiction Work category.

References

External links 
 
 

2020 films
2020 documentary films
Furry fandom
Documentary films about fandom
American independent films
2020 directorial debut films
2020s English-language films
2020s American films